Ulleskelf railway station serves Ulleskelf in North Yorkshire, England.

History
The station opened on 29 May 1839 on the York and North Midland Railway near where it crossed the River Wharfe. The station appears to have been subsequently redesigned and slightly relocated following the construction of the bridge carrying New Road (the B1223) over the tracks: the 1849 Ordnance Survey map (which predates the bridge) implies that the first station building was either adjacent to, and at right angles to, the Ulleskelf Arms public house, or directly across the track from the pub on West End Road. Neither of these two candidate buildings survives.  The map drawn from the 1888 survey shows the station in its current position on the south side of the new road bridge, with a new access road from the east end of the bridge across Hall Garth to the junction of Main Street and a newly-extended Church Fenton Lane. This map shows the station alongside a goods yard built on the site shown to be a plant nursery on the 1849 map. Further evidence of this change in layout is the existence of the terrace called 'Station Cottages' on Main Street at the junction of Church Fenton Lane, now some 200m north of, and out of sight of, the modern station. The station avoided the Beeching Axe in the mid 1960s due to the poor road network in the area (there being no easily accessible road bridge over the river for York-bound commuters). Today the station is unstaffed with all trains operated by Northern. Though there are four tracks in the vicinity, the island platform only serves the eastern pair.

Accidents and incidents
On 24 November 1906, a passenger train overran signals and ran into the rear of a freight train.
Whilst the locomotive stayed upright, all the carriages de-railed and carriages six and seven rolled down a steep bank. This resulted in 24 people requiring hospitalisation with nine of those being serious. One man later died of his injuries. The cause of the derailment was found to be a crack in one of the rails of the Up Normanton line.

Services
Eighteen trains call at Ulleskelf on weekdays and Saturdays.

In December 1997, a wheelchair accessible footbridge opened.

Modernisation/electrification
In May 2021 as part of the Transpennine Route Upgrade, it was confirmed electrification of the line between York and Church Fenton would happen along with other upgrades. Further confirmation of the upgrade came from the publishing in November 2021 of the Integrated Rail Plan for the North and Midlands (IRP) which includes full electrification between York through Church Fenton to Manchester.

References

External links

Railway stations in North Yorkshire
DfT Category F2 stations
Railway stations in Great Britain opened in 1839
Northern franchise railway stations
Former York and North Midland Railway stations
George Townsend Andrews railway stations